Sophie Masite born:1958

died:April 1997
  
Soweto, Johannesburg. She was the first woman to be mayor of Soweto. She was part of the 1976 generation of activists as a member of the Soweto Student Representative Council, where she played a leading role in the organisation of the protests against the apartheid state during the Soweto uprising.

Activism

Masite was a leader in many mass democratic organisations, including the Detainees' Parents' support Committee, an affiliate of the UDM. she also led the Jabavu Branch of the ANC between 1990 and 1994.She led the rent boycott in the 1980s, but insisted on payment for services when the political motivation for the boycott ended.

Mayorship 

Masite became the first black female mayor in South Africa when she was appointed to the greater Johannesburg's Southern Council in 1995. the council consisted of the CBD and its southern suburbs of Soweto, Orange Farm, Lenasia and Ennerdale.

References

1958 births
Living people
Women mayors of places in South Africa